The Hotel Alexandra, historically the Walworth Building, is a High Victorian Gothic structure built in the 1870s with a sandstone facade at the corner of Washington Street and Massachusetts Avenue in the South End of Boston, Massachusetts. The structure is located within the South End Landmark District which was established in 1983.

History 
The hotel was developed by the Walworth Brothers who founded The Walworth Manufacturing Company which was a pioneer in steam technology in the late 19th century. This is likely the reason the hotel was equipped with a rare steam powered elevator. The hotel is of Victorian Heritage as it was named after Alexandra of Denmark. The hotel was opened in 1875 to crowded cobblestone streets, filled not with cars, but horses and buggies. The South End of Boston was barely 20 years old. Always a distinct building, the hotel originally stood prominently especially since most of the buildings around it were warehouses.  In 1900 the hotel began a gradual desolation after the opening of an elevated train line right outside.

At the time the Alexandra was being constructed, Walworth lived nearby at 38 West Newton St. His partner, Emil C. Hammer (1824-1894), was living with Walworth’s family at the time of the 1860 census, and became treasurer of the Walworth Manufacturing Co. He later moved into the Hotel Alexandra. He would go on to found the United States Watch Factory in Waltham, MA around 1886. According to a bookplate on his FindaGrave page, he was the Danish Consul at the port of Boston for the last 35 years of his life. In addition to his later work in the South End, the contractor and builder Ivory Bean (1818-1903), 3 was also responsible for the 1853 row house next door to the Hotel Alexandra. This row house was demolished in the early 2010s as a result of its advanced deteriorated state

The long-hidden architect of the Hotel Alexandra has now been discovered to be Peabody and Stearns, according to a short building permits
report in the Suffolk County Journal.

Rebirth 
The hotel was discovered indefinitely vacant in the early 1990s. The residential hotel, which featured 50 rooms and 2,000 square-foot flats with high, elegant ceilings, was acquired by the Church of Scientology.

In 2018 Alexandra Partners proposed restoring the historic facade of the Alexandra and constructing a 13-story hotel tower at the rear and side of the existing structure. The project received all the necessary approvals from city agencies in late 2019.

According to the Boston Sun, in September 2020 the building site was again placed on the market.

References

1870s establishments in Massachusetts
19th century in Boston
Buildings and structures completed in the 1870s
Hotels in Boston